Paul Andrew Strang (born 28 July 1970) is a Zimbabwean cricket coach and former international player. A leg-spinning all-rounder, he played in 24 Test matches and 95 One Day Internationals for Zimbabwe between 1994 and 2001. He played Test cricket alongside his brother, Bryan Strang; their father, Ronald Strang, was a first-class umpire and was TV umpire for two of Zimbabwe's Test matches in 1994/5.

Strang has since moved into coaching, joining the Auckland Aces as a high performance coach in 2008, and becoming the full-time coach soon afterwards.

Domestic career
He played two seasons of county cricket as an overseas player, firstly for Kent County Cricket Club in 1997 and then for Nottinghamshire in 1998.

International career
He studied at the University of Cape Town, and toured Pakistan with the Zimbabwe side in 1993/4. He played his first Test in 1994, and became a professional cricketer in 1995. He was one of the leading wicket-takers in the 1996 Cricket World Cup in India, taking 12 wickets with a bowling average of 16, although the team was knocked out in the preliminary stage, beating Kenya (with Strang taking 5 wickets) but losing its other 4 matches.

He scored his only Test century in the 1st innings of the 1st Test against Pakistan at Sheikhupura in 1996–7, batting at No. 8, including a stand of 87 with his brother for the 9th wicket. He also took 5 wickets in Pakistan's 1st innings in the same match. Strang's achievement was overshadowed by a double century, 257 not out, scored by Wasim Akram, and the match was drawn.

He played in the 1999 Cricket World Cup in England, where Zimbabwe beat Kenya, India and South Africa to qualify for the "Super Six" stage. He obtained his best Test bowling figures of 8–109 in the 1st innings against New Zealand at Bulawayo in 2000–1, although Zimbabwe lost the match by 7 wickets. This remains the best bowling figures recorded by a Zimbabwean in an innings in Test cricket (the best match figures belong to Adam Huckle). He only played in three further Tests, with his international career curtailed by a chronic injury to the muscles of his right hand in 2000.

Records
 Strang is the only Zimbabwean Test cricketer to take ten wickets in a match and still end up on the losing side of a test match.

References

External links

1970 births
Zimbabwe Test cricketers
Zimbabwe One Day International cricketers
Living people
Cricketers from Bulawayo
White Zimbabwean sportspeople
Alumni of Falcon College
Zimbabwean cricketers
CFX Academy cricketers
Mashonaland cricketers
Marylebone Cricket Club cricketers
Kent cricketers
Nottinghamshire cricketers
Manicaland cricketers
Commonwealth Games competitors for Zimbabwe
Cricketers at the 1998 Commonwealth Games
Cricketers at the 1996 Cricket World Cup
Cricketers at the 1999 Cricket World Cup
University of Cape Town alumni
Zimbabwean cricket coaches